Franz Samelson (September 23, 1923 – March 16, 2015) was a German-American social psychologist and historian of psychology.

Samelson was born on September 23, 1923 in present-day Wroclaw, Poland (then known as Breslau, Germany). Prohibited by the laws of Nazi Germany from attending any German universities, he instead attended a photography school in Munich, where he later worked in a factory with prisoners of war. After World War II ended, he began working for the United States Army. He also enrolled at the University of Munich, where he received a diploma in psychology in 1952.

In 1952, he emigrated to the United States, following his older brother Hans. He went on to receive his Ph.D. in psychology from the University of Michigan in 1956. He joined the faculty of Kansas State University in 1957, where he remained until retiring as Professor in 1990.

Samelson died on March 16, 2015, in Manhattan, Kansas.

References

Further reading

1923 births
2015 deaths
American historians of science
American social psychologists
Historians of psychology
20th-century American historians
American male non-fiction writers
German emigrants to the United States
Writers from Wrocław
Ludwig Maximilian University of Munich alumni
University of Michigan alumni
Kansas State University faculty
20th-century American male writers